Tanzania is a country on the Swahili Coast of the East African coast, composed of mainland Tanganyika and insular Zanzibar.

Tanzania may also refer to:

 Tanzania (spider), a genus of African jumping spider
 Mainland Tanzania, as opposed to insular Zanzibar
 Tanzania Craton, a geologic craton in Tanzania
 Open University of Tanzania, Dar Es Salaam, Tanzania
 Air Tanzania, an airline, the flag carrier of Tanzania

See also

 Outline of Tanzania
 Tanzanian people
 Tanzanian sign languages
 
 Tanganyika (disambiguation)
 Zanzibar (disambiguation)